Researchsome belongs to the -omics set of words, which comprises genomics, proteomics, metabolomics and  related words dealing with scientific research, mostly in the biological sciences and related disciplines, like bioinformatics.

Origin of term 
Devised partly as a joke, the term was coined by Ivan Erill, from UMBC, and first used in an oral communication at the 15th Evolutionary Biology Meeting at Marseilles (France) in 2011.  As opposed to other -omic words, which originate as portmanteau from incorrect application of either the -some suffix (derived from the Greek σῶμα (soma, body) as in chromosome or the -nome suffix (from the Greek νόμος (nomos, "custom" or "law") as in economics), researchsome is among the few newly minted words in the biosciences that derives properly from soma and should be read as "body of research". Obviously, the word has a double entendre interpretation as "some research".

Application 
As an entity, the researchsome is meant to be a graphical representation of the body of research conducted by a particular individual or organization. It depicts research fields and their interconnections, much in the same way that graphical renditions of interactomes outline molecules and their interactions. In its original application, the researchsome was designed to convey a rapid overview of a researcher's areas of expertise onto which the relevant fields for a given lecture or talk could be highlighted.

See also
 List of omics topics in biology
 Omics
 Genome
 Chromosome

References

External links 
 Evolutionary Biology Meeting at Marseilles

Neologisms
Terminology
Bioinformatics
Research